NHL FaceOff 99 is an ice hockey video game developed by Killer Game and published by 989 Studios for PlayStation in 1998. On the cover is then-Chicago Blackhawks player Chris Chelios.

Reception

The game received "favorable" reviews according to the review aggregation website GameRankings.

References

External links
 

1998 video games
NHL FaceOff
PlayStation (console) games
PlayStation (console)-only games
Video games developed in the United States